Downtown Columbus, Georgia, also called "Uptown" (see here), is the central business district of the city of Columbus, Georgia. The commercial and governmental heart of the city has traditionally been toward the eastern end of Downtown Columbus, between 10th Street and 1st Avenue. Recent developments, particularly between Broadway and 2nd Avenue, have expanded the boundaries of the "central" part of the neighborhood. The term "Downtown Columbus" can also mean this smaller, more commercial area, particularly when used in the context of the city's nightlife and restaurants.

South of Broadway is a much more residential area, characterized by historic homes, new infill construction, and some public housing. This part of Downtown Columbus has the highest concentration of hotels, particularly along Front Avenue, and the Broadway commercial corridor is the center of business.

Overview

Buildings

The following is a list of the tallest buildings in Downtown Columbus.

Historic places
Two Historic Districts are located in the main district of downtown: the Columbus Historic District and the Columbus Historic Riverfront Industrial District Structures listed in the National Register of Historic Places include Columbus Ironworks, the former Ledger-Enquirer Tower, and the YMCA. The Columbus Battlefield spans across the Chattahoochee River in the location of Mott's Green.

Homes

Downtown Columbus is home to many Antebellum homes, most listed in the NRHP,  including the 1839 Goetchius House, the Garrett-Bullock House, and the Illges House. The Mott House was destroyed by fire in 2014; its memorial facade, pictured, was completed in 2016.

Places of interest
Downtown Columbus is full of places that may interest tourists. These places include government buildings, sporting venues and other miscellaneous places, such as parks and convention centers.

Arts
 The Springer Opera House (the official State Theatre of Georgia) opened February 21, 1871. Today, the Springer Opera House hosts performances year-round on two stages. Emily Woodruff Hall, the 700-seat main theatre, hosts the popular Mainstage Series which features some of the nation's newest plays and musicals as well as timeless Broadway-style productions. Foley Hall, the Springer's more intimate space, hosts its Studio II Series as well as its Children's Theatre Series, featuring many of the area's talented student actors.
 RiverCenter for the Performing Arts opened in 2002 and has held host to many performances.

Governmental facilities
 The Columbus Consolidated Government Center is the seat of the government for the City of Columbus. This building is where the Muscogee County Board of Commissioners meet as well as many of the county departments. The Government Center is located in the area that is bounded by 9th Street to the south, 2nd Avenue to the east, 10 Street to the north, and 1st Avenue to the west.
 The U.S. Post Office and Courthouse is historic building and functioning post office located two blocks from the Government Center.

Museums
 The National Civil War Naval Museum at Port Columbus is a facility that opened in 1962 and showcases information and artifacts from the Battle of Columbus, including two original American Civil War military vessels, uniforms, equipment and weapons used by the Union and Confederate navies.
 The Coca-Cola Challenger Space Science Center opened in 1996 for the purpose of public education in science, physics, and astronomy. It includes seven flight simulators and a planetarium.

Recreation
 The Chattahoochee RiverWalk is a  walking/bike trail that connects users from downtown to South Columbus and the northern section of Fort Benning.
 Whitewater Express is a rafting service on the Chattahoochee River. The  course is the longest urban whitewater rafting in the world, and has been ranked the world's best manmade whitewater course in the world by USA Today. It also features the Blue Heron Adventure, a zip-line connecting users from the Georgia side of the river to the Alabama side.

Sporting venues
 The largest indoor sporting arena in the city of Columbus is the Columbus Civic Center, which has a total capacity of 10,000 and is also home to the Columbus Lions, the city's PIFL football team, and also home to the Columbus Cottonmouths, the city's Southern Professional Hockey League team.
 Golden Park is a total 5,000 seat baseball stadium currently not home to a minor league baseball team.
 A. J. McClung Memorial Stadium, the site of football games between the Georgia Bulldogs and the Auburn Tigers from 1916 until 1958 (the Deep South's Oldest Rivalry). The stadium now hosts the Fort Valley State-Albany State and the Tuskegee-Morehouse rivalry games, as well local youth football and soccer and high school football games.

Places of worship

Downtown consists of many places to worship, such as historic Church of the Holy Family, Columbus' first Roman Catholic parish. The area is also home to other historic congregations, including First Baptist Church, First Presbyterian Church, St. George's Anglican Church, St. Luke United Methodist Church, and Trinity Episcopal Church.

Transportation
There are many modes of transportation in Downtown Columbus that can be used by both tourists and residents. METRA Transit System operates bus service in downtown, which connects riders to other places in the city. The primary way of getting around downtown for many people is by car. Downtown Columbus is accessible from Interstate 185 by J. R. Allen Parkway, which allows direct travel into the area via 2nd Avenue. Downtown is also served by two arterial roads, Veterans Parkway (north–south) and Victory Drive (east–west).

"Downtown"/"Uptown"
There is confusion brought about by the use of the terms "Downtown" and "Uptown" for Columbus' central business district.  Uptown Columbus is the title given to both a non-profit organization operating to encourage area growth and development (sometimes called "urban renewal") and also to the actual physical area of that development itself, which is an expanding subsection of the Downtown district located in the areas from Broadway to the Chattahoochee River.

Tornado
On April 20, 2009, at approximately 12:40 AM Eastern Daylight Time, an EF2 tornado hit downtown with winds up to 135 miles per hour (217 km/h). This tornado caused damage to the Columbus State University Campus, the Springer Opera House, and the RiverCenter for the Performing Arts. This is the first time a tornado touched ground in downtown Columbus since weather records keeping began in the 1890s. While there were dozens of injuries, there were no fatalities.

Gallery

References

External links

 Official Website for the City of Columbus
 Website for visitors info

Neighborhoods in Columbus, Georgia
Columbus, Georgia